UWE (UML-based Web Engineering) is a software engineering approach for the development of Web applications. UWE provides a UML profile (UML extension), a metamodel, model-driven development process and tool support (ArgoUWE) for the systematic design of Web applications. UWE follows the separation of concerns building separate models for requirements, content, hypertext, presentation, process, adaptivity and architecture.    

The key aspects that distinguish UWE are reliance on OMG standards and an open source environment.

See also 
 Web engineering
 Web modeling

External links
 UWE site

Unified Modeling Language